Tracie Lehuanani Ruiz-Conforto (born February 4, 1963) is a three-time Olympic medalist from the United States in synchronised swimming.

Career
Tracie excelled in both the solo and duet routines, winning a total of 41 gold medals during her career at national and international level. In the women's solo event, Ruiz achieved consecutive victories at the 1983 and 1987 Pan American Games, and she was the inaugural champion  at the 1984 Summer Olympics. She narrowly missed out on a further gold at the 1988 Summer Olympics, settling for silver after having been beaten by her Canadian rival, Carolyn Waldo. Her domination of the event at the national level resulted in first place at all six US championships between 1981 and 1986.

She enjoyed a successful partnership with fellow American, Candy Costie, which included a silver medal in the women's duet at the 1982 World Aquatics Championships in Guayaquil. Over the next few years, they increased their medal haul, winning gold at both the 1983 Pan American Games and the 1984 Summer Olympics. Their partnership also extended to winning four US national championships and one NCAA national championship.

Personal life
In June 1985, she married Michael Anthony Conforto, a former Penn State football player who had helped her train for the Olympics. Their son, Michael Conforto, played professional baseball for the New York Mets from 2015-2021 and is currently a member of the San Francisco Giants. Their daughter, Jacqueline, played soccer at Azusa Pacific University.

Awards
Tracie Ruiz was inducted into the International Swimming Hall of Fame in Fort Lauderdale, Florida in 1993.

See also
 List of members of the International Swimming Hall of Fame

References

External links
 

1963 births
Living people
American synchronized swimmers
Synchronized swimmers at the 1984 Summer Olympics
Synchronized swimmers at the 1988 Summer Olympics
Olympic gold medalists for the United States in synchronized swimming
Olympic silver medalists for the United States in synchronized swimming
Sportspeople from Honolulu
Medalists at the 1988 Summer Olympics
Medalists at the 1984 Summer Olympics
World Aquatics Championships medalists in synchronised swimming
Pan American Games gold medalists for the United States
Pan American Games medalists in synchronized swimming
Synchronized swimmers at the 1983 Pan American Games
Synchronized swimmers at the 1987 Pan American Games
Swimmers from Honolulu
Swimming commentators
Medalists at the 1983 Pan American Games
Medalists at the 1987 Pan American Games